Simple Forms is the third studio album by New Zealand indie electronic band The Naked and Famous. It was released on 14 October 2016 by Somewhat Damaged in partnership with Kobalt Label Services. "Higher" was released as the album's lead single on 8 July 2016.

Critical reception

Matt Collar of AllMusic commented that Simple Forms is "less overtly bombastic than the group's previous work" and "[t]here's a tenderness to the arrangements that feels straightforward and uncluttered", concluding, "Ultimately, if there is a nuanced sophistication to the band's work on Simple Forms, it feels genuine and hard-won."

Jaymz Clements of Rolling Stone Australia wrote, "At times, [...] it feels like the Naked and Famous are playing musical catch-up, as Simple Forms struggles to move beyond place-holder synth-pop like 'Water Beneath You'. But when Xayalith and former partner Thom Powers team up on the sparkling 'My Energy' and 'Last Forever', their taut, dynamic atmosphere shines."

Cyclone Wehner of News.com.au felt that "[t]he trouble is that TNAF [...] tend to work to an anthemic formula. And no songs here are as memorable as the early 'Young Blood'."

Track listing

Personnel
Credits adapted from the liner notes of Simple Forms.

The Naked and Famous
 The Naked and Famous – production
 Thomas Powers – production

Additional personnel
 Ken Andrews – mixing
 Carlos de la Garza – live instrumentation engineering
 Joel Kefali – artwork
 Joe LaPorta – mastering
 Sombear – additional production

Charts

Release history

References

2016 albums
Albums produced by Carlos de la Garza (music producer)
The Naked and Famous albums